Pluchea sericea, commonly called arrowweed or cachanilla (Mexico), is a rhizomatous evergreen shrub of riparian areas in the lower Sonoran Desert and surrounding areas. It is common in the lower Colorado River valley of California, Nevada and Arizona, as far east as Texas, and in northern Mexico where it often forms dense impenetrable thickets. It is a perennial shrub and grows along watercourses.

Uses
It was once used medicinally by Native Americans as an antidiarrheal and eyewash. Other traditional uses include thatching, arrowmaking and food, especially the edible root.

In other uses, the gum resin that exudes from the plant was used by the Papago Indians to make a mending glue on broken pottery.

References

External links
 Calflora: Pluchea sericea  (Arrow weed, Arrowweed)
Jepson eFlora (TJM2) treatment
USDA Plants Profile
UC CalPhotos gallery

sericea
Flora of Northwestern Mexico
Flora of California
Flora of the South-Central United States
Flora of the Southwestern United States
Flora of the Sonoran Deserts
Flora of the California desert regions
Natural history of the California chaparral and woodlands
Natural history of the Mojave Desert
Plants used in Native American cuisine
Plants used in traditional Native American medicine
Flora without expected TNC conservation status